Eschen (High Alemannic: Escha) is a municipality in the north of Liechtenstein. It is the fourth-largest town in Liechtenstein by population.

Geography
The municipality includes the village of Nendeln, which has a train station on the Feldkirch-Buchs line.

Politics 
The community leader is Quaderer Tino (FBP), the regional council consists of eleven seats.

Economy 
The headquarters of Novodent and ThyssenKrupp Presta are located in Eschen.

Sport
USV Eschen/Mauren is the municipality's football club.

Notable people 

 Gerard Batliner (1928 in Eschen – 2008 in Eschen) an attorney-at-law and was Head of Government (Regierungschef) of Liechtenstein 1962–1970
 Marlies Amann-Marxer (born 1952) a politician from Liechtenstein, former Minister of Infrastructure, Environment and Sport until 2017; lives with family in Eschen
 Mauro Pedrazzini (born 1965) a politician from Liechtenstein, current Minister of Social Affairs; he is doctor of physics, lives in Eschen
 John Latenser Sr. (1858–1936) Native of Nendeln. Architect involved in several large public projects in Omaha, Nebraska of the US.

References

External links

Official website

Municipalities of Liechtenstein